Return of Toofan Mail is a Bollywood film. It was released in 1942.

References

External links
 

1942 films
1940s Hindi-language films
Indian action films
1940s action films
Indian black-and-white films
Hindi-language action films